The 2016–17 season was Associazione Sportiva Roma's 89th in existence and 88th season in the top flight of Italian football. The team competed in four competitions: in Serie A, finishing 2nd for the third time in four seasons; the Coppa Italia, where they were eliminated in the semi-finals by city rivals Lazio; the UEFA Champions League, where the club was eliminated in the play-off round by Portuguese club FC Porto; and in the UEFA Europa League, in which the team reached the Round of 16 only to be eliminated by eventual semi-finalists Olympique Lyonnais.

The season was notable for being club legend and veteran Francesco Totti's 24th and last, as his retirement as a Roma player was confirmed shortly before the last match of the season against Genoa. In addition, Bosnian striker Edin Džeko won the prestigious top scorer award in Serie A, the capocannoniere, with 29 goals, becoming the first Roma player in a decade to win the award. He also won the top scorer award in the UEFA Europa League with 8 goals, tied with Zenit Saint Petersburg striker Giuliano.

Players

Squad information
Last updated on 28 May 2017
Appearances include all competitions

Transfers

In

Loans in

Out

Loans out

Pre-season and friendlies

Competitions

Overall

Last updated: 28 May 2017

Serie A

League table

Results summary

Results by round

Matches

Coppa Italia

UEFA Champions League

Play-off round

UEFA Europa League

Group stage

Knockout phase

Round of 32

Round of 16

Statistics

Appearances and goals

|-
! colspan=14 style="background:#B21B1C; color:#FFD700; text-align:center"| Goalkeepers

|-
! colspan=14 style="background:#B21B1C; color:#FFD700; text-align:center"| Defenders

|-
! colspan=14 style="background:#B21B1C; color:#FFD700; text-align:center"| Midfielders

|-
! colspan=14 style="background:#B21B1C; color:#FFD700; text-align:center"| Forwards

|-
! colspan=14 style="background:#B21B1C; color:#FFD700; text-align:center"| Players transferred out during the season

Goalscorers

Last updated: 28 May 2017

Clean sheets

Last updated: 28 May 2017

Disciplinary record
Last updated: 28 May 2017

References

A.S. Roma seasons
Roma
Roma
Roma